Trunk 22 is part of the Canadian province of Nova Scotia's system of trunk highways.

Trunk 22, which leaves Sydney to the southeast on George Street, is known over most of its route as the Mira Road. The route crosses the Mira River at Albert Bridge.

Major intersections

References

022
Roads in the Cape Breton Regional Municipality